Water Valley High School is a high school in Water Valley, Mississippi.

Mississippi's only environmental and spatial technology lab is located at Water Valley High School.

Curriculum 
Water Valley High School offers traditional academic courses, including Advanced Placement in English.

Vocational and technical programs are offered in agriculture, building trades, cooperative education, and food services.

Extracurricular activities
Extracurricular activities include band, baseball, basketball, cheerleading, football, softball, and track.

The school has a very strong Chess Club and scored 12 points out of 20 to finish fifth in the state at the 2017 Mississippi K–12 Team Championship. The Chess Club also hosts two tournaments a year for the Mississippi Scholastic Chess Association which are rated by the United States Chess Federation.

Notable alumni 
 Kevin Horan, member of the Mississippi House of Representatives
 Bryant Mix, professional football player

References

External links 
 

Public high schools in Mississippi
Schools in Yalobusha County, Mississippi